Mexico competed at the 2022 World Games held in Birmingham, United States from 7 to 17 July 2022. Athletes representing Mexico won five gold medals, two silver medals and five bronze medals. The country finished in 16th place in the medal table.

Medalists

|  style="text-align:left; width:56%; vertical-align:top;"|

Invitational sports 

|  style="text-align:left; width:22%; vertical-align:top;"|

Competitors
The following is the list of number of competitors in the Games.

Archery

Mexico won one gold medal in archery.

Compound

Beach handball

Mexico competed in beach handball.

Bowling

Mexico competed in bowling.

Dancesport

Mexico competed in dancesport.

Duathlon

Mexico won one bronze medal in duathlon.

Flag football

Mexico won two medals in flag football.

Ju-jitsu

Mexico competed in ju-jitsu.

Kickboxing

Mexico won one gold medal in kickboxing.

Muaythai

Mexico won one bronze medal in muaythai.

Racquetball

Mexico won three medals in racquetball.

Road speed skating

Mexico won three medals in road speed skating.

Softball

Mexico finished in 8th place in the softball tournament.

Track speed skating

Mexico competed in track speed skating.

Water skiing

Mexico competed in water skiing.

Wushu

Mexico competed in wushu.

References

Nations at the 2022 World Games
2022
World Games